Statistics of the Scottish Football League in season 1924–25.

Scottish League Division One

Scottish League Division Two

Scottish League Division Three

See also
1924–25 in Scottish football

References

 
Scottish Football League seasons
Scotland